AT-076 is a so-called opioid "pan" antagonist and is the first reasonably balanced antagonist known of all four opioid receptor types. It acts as a silent antagonist of all four of the opioid receptors, behaving as a competitive antagonist of the μ-opioid receptor (Ki = 1.67 nM) and δ-opioid receptor (Ki = 19.6 nM) and as a noncompetitive antagonist of the κ-opioid receptor (Ki = 1.14 nM) and nociceptin receptor (Ki = 1.75 nM). AT-076 was derived from the selective κ-opioid receptor antagonist JDTic via removal of the 3,4-dimethyl group of the trans-(3R,4R)-dimethyl-4-(3-hydroxyphenyl)piperidine antagonist scaffold, which increased affinity for the nociceptin receptor by 10-fold and for the μ- and δ-opioid receptors by 3-6-fold.

See also
 AT-121
 Cebranopadol
 Buprenorphine
 BU09059

References

4-Phenylpiperidines
Carboxamides
Delta-opioid receptor antagonists
Kappa-opioid receptor antagonists
Mu-opioid receptor antagonists
Nociceptin receptor antagonists
Phenols
Synthetic opioids
Tetrahydroisoquinolines